The Legislative Assembly of Goiás is the unicameral legislature of the Brazilian state of Goiás. The assembly, which is seated in the state capital of Goiânia, is composed of 41 state deputies elected by proportional representation.

External links
Legislative Assembly of Goiás (in Portuguese)

 
Goiás
Goiás
Government of Goiás